Promina is a municipality in Šibenik-Knin County, Croatia. The village of Oklaj serves as the administration centre of the municipality.

Population
In the 2011 census, it had the following settlements:

 Bobodol, population 23
 Bogatić, population 24
 Čitluk, population 112
 Lukar, population 78
 Ljubotić, population 35
 Matase, population 50
 Mratovo, population 56
 Oklaj, population 469
 Puljane, population 52
 Razvođe, population 170
 Suknovci, population 67

In the 2011 census, there was a total of 1136 inhabitants in the area, with 94.81% of them Croats.

In the 1991 census, 2,574 residents lived in Promina district, of which 85 per cent Croats and 14 per cent Serbs.

Notable people 
Branislav Pokrajac, (handball)
Damir Pokrajac, (basketball)
Ivan Aralica, novelist and writer
Marino Jakovljević (football)
Ante Jakovljević (football)
Martin Klepo (tennis)
Danijel Bandalo (basketball)
Luka Duvančić (football)
Slavko Kulić, economist
Josipa Rimac, politician
Tomislav Gabrić (basketball)

References

External links

Municipalities of Croatia
Populated places in Šibenik-Knin County